Syringoporidae is an extinct family of phaceloid tabulate coral.

These tabulate corals lived from the Ordovician to the Permian period (from 449.5 to 279.5 Ma). Fossils of species belonging to the Syringoporidae family have been found in the sediments of Europe, Russia, China, Japan, Thailand, Australia, Canada and United States.

Genera
 Cannapora Hall 1852
 Chia Lin 1958
 Enigmalites Tchudinova 1975
 Kueichowpora Chi 1933
 Oharaia Nelson 1977
 Pleurosiphonella Chudinova 1970
 Spinuliplena Pickett 1994
 Syringoalcyon Termier and Termier 1945
 Syringocolumna Stumm 1969
 Syringopora Goldfuss 1826
 Syringoporiella Rukhin 1937
 Vinculumtes Khayznikova 1989

References

Tabulata
Prehistoric cnidarian families
Ordovician first appearances
Late Devonian animals
Permian extinctions